Vrijdag (Dutch for Friday) is a 1980 Belgian-Dutch drama film directed by Hugo Claus, based on his 1969 play (a "classic" Dutch play). It was entered into the 31st Berlin International Film Festival. The film focuses on a couple, Georges and Jeanne, in a quiet Dutch countryside as they cope and catch up with each other after Georges is released from jail.

Plot
Georges Vermeersch is released from prison after two years. He returns to his hometown of Marke on a Friday afternoon where he awkwardly reunites with his wife Jeanne and meets her baby daughter Elisabeth. 

Prior to his arrest, Georges and Jeanne were a couple living with their daughter Christiane. Christiane always favored her father since childhood and formed a close bond with him, but this developed into incestuous feelings as she grew into her teenager years. While Jeanne is away, Christiane manages to seduce her father and they have sex. Christiane later has a boyfriend, Jacky, and the two join a gang of petty burglars. When the gang is caught by the authorities, the policemen chastise Jacky for dating the young Christiane, to which Jacky blurts out Christiane's father being her first lover.

Georges is arrested on grounds of incest, with the town testifying either for or against him, with Jeanne defending her husband. Christiane admits her affair with her father, and Georges is sentenced to prison. There, he spends time with Jules, a mentally ill former customs officer who was jailed for having sex with a random passerby and spends time painting while incarcerated to prevent manic moments. While Georges is in prison, Jeanne starts a relationship with Georges' friend, Erik. Jeanne gives birth to Erik's daughter, Elisabeth, whose birth Georges hears and believes was punishment for his act. Eventually, he is released early, and he is gifted a painting by Jules as a parting gift before he leaves.

In the present, Jeanne shares that Christiane has moved out to live with Jacky in Guido Gezellestraat near Anderlecht. Their neighbor, Alex, visits the two, but Georges, knowing that he was against him during his arrest, drives him away. Georges says that Jeanne, having found a new lover who supports her in Erik, can move out. Erik later arrives, and they have a tense dinner together. Erik tells the story of how he and Jeanne began their relationship during a funeral of a mutual friend. Georges lashes out at the two before Erik leaves for the night, and the drunk Georges once again starts a fight with Jeanne before briefly making love with her and then passing out. Jeanne goes off to Erik's home, where Erik reveals he has taken a job in Rouen and will leave the next morning. Jeanne is torn between staying with Georges or leaving with Erik, while Erik says he is okay with whoever she chooses. 

Georges retrieves Erik back into his home, where Georges insists to be legally known as Elisabeth's father and the three finally talk about his relationship with Christiane. Georges admits to having sex with his daughter only once; Jeanne confesses she had figured out their affair yet still lied in court. Having closed that chapter, Georges explains that he wants Erik to have sex with Jeanne one last time before Erik leaves for good to conclude their relationship and prevent any lingering feelings. Jeanne and Erik comply while Georges takes a walk outside and falls asleep on a bench before returning the next morning. After breakfast, Erik shares his farewells while Jeanne reluctantly rejects his caresses before he leaves to end their affair. Georges joins Jeanne as they sit together to talk about their plans for the future.

Cast
 Frank Aendenboom - Georges Vermeersch
 Kitty Courbois - Jeanne Vermeersch
 Herbert Flack - Erik
 Hilde Van Mieghem - Christiane Vermeersch
 Hugo Van Den Berghe - Jules
 Theo Daese - Alex
 Jakob Beks - Model voor Jules
 Chris Cauwenbergs - Verpleger in gevangenis
 Dirk Celis - Advokaat Georges
 Jo De Caluwé - Bewaking Delhaize
 Herman Fabri - Secretaris
 Blanka Heirman - Buurvrouw
 Karin Jacobs - Solange
 Guido Lauwaert - Agent
 Ann Petersen - Moeder van Erik
 Fons Rademakers - Chef van Jules
 Roger Raveel - Bijtebier

References

External links

1980 films
1980 drama films
Belgian drama films
Dutch drama films
1980s Dutch-language films
Dutch films based on plays
Films based on works by Hugo Claus
Films directed by Hugo Claus
Belgian films based on plays
Incest in film